'CCCB' may refer to :

The Canadian Conference of Catholic Bishops is the episcopal conference of the Roman Catholic Church in Canada.
The Centre de Cultura Contemporània de Barcelona is a museum adjacent to the Barcelona Museum of Contemporary Art (MACBA).